Sheriff of Dublin City was a judicial and administrative role in Ireland. Initially, the Sovereign's judicial representative in Dublin, the role was later held by two individuals and concerned with a mix of judicial, political and administrative functions. In origins, an office for a lifetime, assigned by the Sovereign, the Sheriff became an annual appointment following the Provisions of Oxford in 1258.

Background
The first Shrievalties were established before the Norman Conquest in 1066 and date back to Saxon times. Besides his judicial importance, the sheriff had ceremonial and administrative functions and executed High Court Writs. In 1908, an Order in Council made the Lord-Lieutenant the Sovereign's prime representative in a county and reduced the Sheriff's precedence. Despite this, the office retained responsibilities for the preservation of law and order in a county.

Dublin
Sheriffs (two for each year) were first appointed in Dublin in 1308 under the name of bailiffs; the title was changed to sheriff in 1548. The sheriffs presided at meetings of the Common Council (the "commons" or lower house of the City Assembly of Dublin), and after their year in office took their place among up to 48 Sheriffs Peers, who sat alongside 96 Guild representatives as the Common Council.

List of Sheriffs of Dublin City

14th century 
1377:  William  Fitzwilliam

15th century 
1406 Thomas Shorthalls, later a Baron of the Court of Exchequer, first term
1414 Thomas Shorthalls, second  term
1424 Thomas Shorthalls, third term
1442/3 William de la Field
1489 Patrick Mole; Thomas Bermingham

16th century

17th century

18th century

19th century

20th century

References

 
Dublin City
History of Dublin (city)